The Women's 50m Backstroke event at the 2006 Central American and Caribbean Games occurred on Wednesday, July 19, 2006, at the S.U. Pedro de Heredia Aquatic Complex in Cartagena, Colombia.

Records

Results

Final

Preliminaries

References

Results: 2006 CACs--Swimming: Women's 50 Backstroke--prelims from the official website of the 2006 Central American and Caribbean Games; retrieved 2009-07-05.
Results: 2006 CACs--Swimming: Women's 50 Backstroke--finals from the official website of the 2006 Central American and Caribbean Games; retrieved 2009-07-05.

Backstroke, Women's 50m
2006 in women's swimming